Brightlingsea railway station was located in Brightlingsea, Essex. It was on the single track branch line of the Wivenhoe and Brightlingsea Railway which opened in 1866 and closed in 1964.

History
The station building was located on the southern side of Lower Park Road where the town's community centre now sits.

The station and line was built by The Wivenhoe & Brightlingsea Railway company. This was incorporated in 1861 to build a line from Wivenhoe to Brightlingsea which opened on 18 April 1866. The company was a separate, but associated, company to the Tendring Hundred Railway which had built the line from Colchester to Wivenhoe. The GER soon negotiated to buy both the Tendring Hundred Railway and the Clacton-on-Sea Railway, and they became part of the GER on 1 July 1883.  The Wivenhoe & Brightlingsea was absorbed by the GER on 9 June 1893.

The station was host to a camping coach from 1936 to 1939.

The line was temporarily closed on 1 February 1953 following severe flood damage but was not reopened until 7 December that year.

Closure
The service was identified for closure the Beeching Report of 1963 and was eventually axed in 1964. This was supposedly prompted by the high costs of maintaining the railway swing bridge over Alresford Creek, which was necessary to allow boat traffic to the many sand and gravel pits in the area.

The station building stayed in place for four years after the railway's closure until it was damaged by fire in 1968. The building was finally demolished in November 1969.

Remains of railway

The visible relics of the railway's presence today are the Railway public house and micro-brewery, and the old embankment which is now a footpath. It is possible to walk along virtually the whole length of the former route from very near the site of the old station in Brightlingsea along the old embankment to the site of the former swing bridge. This makes for a pleasant, scenic walk alongside the River Colne with its ecologically interesting salt marsh environment.

The nearest railway station is now at Alresford.

References

External links
 Brightlingsea station on navigable 1948 O. S. map
 Brightlingsea station, Nov 1969 during demolition

Former Great Eastern Railway stations
Railway stations in Great Britain opened in 1866
Railway stations in Great Britain closed in 1964
Disused railway stations in Essex
Beeching closures in England
1866 establishments in England
Brightlingsea